Pacita Main Gate station (abbreviated Pacita MG) is a railway station located on the South Main Line in San Pedro, Laguna, Philippines. It is located in Pacita Complex 1, San Pedro City, Laguna. As Pacita Main Gate is a flag stop, trains only stop when passengers need to alight or board the station. Nearby landmarks include the Pacita Wet Market, Centro Pacita, Pacita Commercial Center, and Puregold Pacita.

References

Philippine National Railways stations
Railway stations in Laguna (province)
Buildings and structures in San Pedro, Laguna